The Mall at Robinson is a super-regional shopping mall located just off the Parkway West (I-376) and PA Route 60 in Robinson Township, Allegheny County, Pennsylvania, five minutes east of the Pittsburgh International Airport and 15 minutes from downtown Pittsburgh. The mall is owned and managed by Kohan Retail Investment Group of Great Neck, New York.

The mall sits adjacent to Robinson Town Centre, located in the center of a growing retail area that includes Settlers Ridge and The Pointe at North Fayette in North Fayette Township, Pennsylvania.

Anchors
Anchor stores are Dick's Sporting Goods, JCPenney, and Macy's.

Macy's is the northernmost anchor with the former Sears serving as the southernmost anchor.  The Dick's Sporting Goods store sits in the south east corner with JCPenney situated on the west side of the two-floor complex.

A free-standing Kaufmann's department store was built in 1998 and sat as the only operating store until the remainder of the mall property was opened in 2001. The Kaufmann's store became Macy's in 2006.

On May 31, 2018, it was announced that Sears would be closing as part of a plan to close 72 stores nationwide. The store closed in September 2018.

In February 2023, it was announced that Primark and Forman Mills will open a location in the former Sears location, expected to open in September 2023.

Stores
The mall is home to approximately 130 stores including American Eagle Outfitters, Carter's, FYE, Hot Topic, LOFT, PacSun, Rue 21, Victoria's Secret, White House Black Market and Zumiez. The mall's food court, which has about ten eateries, sits on the second floor near the former Sears.

See also
 Robinson Town Centre

References

External links
 The Mall at Robinson
 Robinson Mall and Robinson Town Center described by the Pittsburgh Airport Chamber

Shopping malls in Metro Pittsburgh
Forest City Realty Trust
Shopping malls established in 2001